Bystra Podhalańska (until 2015 Bystra ) is a village in Sucha County, Lesser Poland Voivodeship, in southern Poland. It is the seat of the gmina (administrative district) called Gmina Bystra-Sidzina.

The village has a population of 2,900.

References

Villages in Sucha County